Stick Figure is an American reggae and dub band founded in 2006 and based in Southern California. The group has released seven full-length albums and one instrumental album, all of which were written and produced by frontman and self-taught multi-instrumentalist Scott Woodruff. The live band consists of vocalist, producer and guitarist Scott Woodruff, keyboardist Kevin Bong, drummer Kevin Offitzer, bassist Tommy Suliman and keyboardist, backup vocalist and guitarist Johnny Cosmic. Cocoa, an Australian Shepherd, often joins the band onstage, and has accordingly been nicknamed Cocoa the Tour Dog.

History

Early career
Stick Figure was founded in 2006 as a one-man band by multi-instrumentalist, songwriter, and producer Scott Woodruff. Woodruff, originally from his hometown of Duxbury, Massachusetts, began playing instruments at the age of 9, and was primarily drawn to reggae. His style of layering tracks to create songs was particularly inspired by Keller Williams who utilized a looping method to create music.

Woodruff began writing and producing music in 2006, which incorporated roots reggae with dub, a subgenre of reggae.
As a freshman in college, Woodruff began submitting instrumental tracks to the Sublime Archive website and consequently adopted the moniker "Stick Figure".

Early releases
On December 11, 2007, Woodruff released his first album The Sound of My Addiction under Ruffwood Records (a pun on his last name). Founded by Scott Woodruff, Ruffwood Records released all of Woodruff's albums to date. The Sound of My Addiction established Stick Figure's style of self-production. Woodruff created this album by "recording instruments individually, [and] layering tracks on top of one another in unison", a style he used to create subsequent albums.

On January 16, 2008, Woodruff released his sophomore album, Burnin' Ocean under Ruffwood Records. This album was one of the Top 10 Best Reggae Albums in 2008 on the Apple iTunes charts; notable tracks include "Burnin' Ocean", "So Good" and "We Get High".

Smoke Stack and Reprise Sessions (2009–2011)
In the summer of 2009, Woodruff moved to the San Diego area and shortly after released his subsequent album, Smoke Stack. This album followed the same recording style of the previous two albums where he individually recorded and layered each track to create a song. Notable songs include "Livin' It", "Hawaii Song" and "Vibes Alive".

Smoke Stack was well-received and peaked at #8 on the Billboard Reggae Albums chart and #17 on the Heatseekers Album Chart.

Next, he released, The Reprise Sessions on August 3, 2010 under Ruffwood Records. This rarity album was an extension to Smoke Stack. Notable tracks include "Your Way" and "Dead End Street".

Burial Ground (2012)
On June 12, 2012, two years after releasing Reprise Sessions, Woodruff released the fourth Stick Figure studio album, Burial Ground.

All 14 tracks were written and produced by Woodruff, one of which features vocals by reggae singer Half Pint, and one of which features vocals from Woodruff's close friend, T.J. O'Neill. Woodruff co-wrote five of the tracks with O'Neill; the two had spent time traveling abroad together in Indonesia, Australia, Fiji, Thailand, and New Zealand starting in 2010, finding mutual inspiration for songwriting.

The album reached #1 on the iTunes and Billboard Reggae charts, and reached #17 on the Heatseekers Albums chart in the United States.

Burial Ground met with a positive critical response, with a number of critics noting the mixing of upbeat reggae and dub. According to The Reggae Review, "Original, bass-heavy, one drop beats are consistent throughout the album, as are the subtle nuances...and sometimes not so subtle nuances....of dub. Stick Figure's digits remain firmly on the pulse of roots reggae/dub music." The Pier stated, "the album represents a new milestone in Stick Figure's musical growth and innovative abilities, with more layering, instrumental transcendence, and lyrical complexity [than their previous albums]."

Live touring band

After the release of Burial Ground in 2012, Woodruff organized a live band, adding members Kevin Bong (KBong) on keyboards, Kevin Offitzer on drums, and Tommy Suliman on bass. The newly formed quartet then went on tour with reggae band The Green starting in September 2012. This tour included eighteen stops along the East Coast of the United States.

In Spring 2013, Stick Figure embarked on their first headlining tour with stops in major cities including Boston, Austin, Denver and Chicago with multiple sold-out shows. That year they also went on three national tours alongside reggae bands Passafire, John Brown's Body, and Tribal Seeds.

In 2014, they headlined their first national tour, with numerous sold-out shows including a performance at West Hollywood's renowned Roxy Theater that sold out two weeks before the show date.

Within two years of forming a live band, Stick Figure toured with other major acts including Rebelution, Slightly Stoopid, Collie Buddz, Passafire, Tribal Seeds and The Expendables. They performed at various internationally recognized festivals including Reggae on the River, Cali Roots Festival, Life is Beautiful, Closer to the Sun, Levitate, and Bonnaroo, amongst others.

Move to Northern California
In 2015, Scott Woodruff relocated from San Diego to a home in the woods in the outskirts of Santa Cruz. Immediately after relocating to his new home, Woodruff built Ruffwood Studios where he recorded the subsequent Stick Figure album, Set in Stone. Woodruff found much inspiration for this album from the redwood forest just outside of his studio.

Set in Stone and touring (2015–2018)
On November 13, 2015, Woodruff released his fifth studio album, Set in Stone. The album peaked at #1 on the Billboard Reggae Albums chart, and spent 78 weeks on the chart. It appeared on six Billboard charts overall, including #101 on the Billboard 200, #24 on Digital Albums, #1 on Heatseekers Albums, #7 on Independent Albums, and #65 on the Top Album Sales chart.

Woodruff produced this album in the same way he produced the five previous albums. The 14-track album includes collaborations with Eric Rachmany of Rebelution, Slightly Stoopid, KBong, and Collie Buddz.

Following the album's release, in January 2016, the live band embarked on a U.S. tour with the Southern California reggae band Fortunate Youth. John Gray (a.k.a. Johnny Cosmic), a multi-instrumentalist, made his debut appearance as a member of the Stick Figure live band on this tour playing keyboards, singing backup vocals and playing guitar.

With the success and popularity of Set In Stone, Stick Figure released their first instrumental album, Set In Stone: Instrumentals on April 1, 2016.

World on Fire and Fire & Stone (2019–2021)

Stick Figure collaborated with long-time friend and musician T.J. O'Neill on his first solo single, the Jimmy Buffett cover "A Pirate Looks at 40" also featuring KBong and Johnny Cosmic. The music video was shot live on location at a resort in Mexico with thousands of fans surrounding the band while performing.

On August 30, 2019, Stick Figure released his sixth studio album, World on Fire. Like previous projects, the album was written, recorded, and produced by Scott Woodruff, playing every instrument and recording each vocal himself. This time, however, the album was created at Stick Figure-owned Great Stone Studios in Oakland, California, former home of punk band Green Day. With assistance from associate producer Johnny Cosmic (Stick Figure live guitarist, keys, and back up vocals), the 15 track project included guest appearances from Slightly Stoopid, Citizen Cope, and longtime Stick Figure collaborator TJ O'Neill.

The album debuted on a number of Billboard charts, including #34 on the Top 200 chart, #1 Billboard Reggae Albums, #4 Digital Albums, #5 New Albums, #6 Current Albums, and #2 Independent Albums. The highest selling debut week album of the year, World on Fire sold more copies in week one (over 10,000) than the previous year's winner (Sting and Shaggy's "44/876"). The album remained at #1 on the Billboard Reggae Albums chart for four consecutive weeks.

The album has garnered considerable radio play, including on SiriusXM's The Joint, SiriusXM's No Shoes Radio, and SiriusXM's Margaritaville. Stick Figure was also the first artist to be named the face of Cali Reggae Countdown on Pandora Radio.

In 2020, Stick Figure announced their first ever headline amphitheater tour. The tour featured support from Collie Buddz, Iya Terra, and The Movement, and visits to 19 cities nationwide. However, the tour was canceled due to the COVID-19 pandemic.

On March 18, 2021, Stick Figure released their second instrumental album, World on Fire: Instrumentals.

Stick Figure teamed up with UK producer and dub music master Prince Fatty to remix some of the band's favorite songs from albums, Set in Stone and World on Fire. The full remix album titled after these albums, Fire & Stone was released on April 30, 2021. A single from the album, "Weary Eyes (Prince Fatty Presents)" premiered on April 9. The new tracks have a hundred percent new instrumentation, giving each song a "fresh new taste and roots feel".

Wisdom (2022)
After three years in the making, Stick Figure recorded their seventh full-length studio album titled, Wisdom, which was released on September 9, 2022. The 14-track album was once again recorded and mixed at Woodruff's Great Stone Studio with childhood friend TJ O'Neill assisting in the creative process, while original band members KBong, Kevin Offitzer, Tommy Suliman, and Johnny Cosmic, along with new member, percussionist Will Phillips bring their talents in Woodruff's songs to life. Woodruff also added a full brass section with Liam Robertson on saxophone, Quinn Carson on trombone and Glenn Holdaway on trumpet on some tracks. With beautiful cover art by Juan Manuel Orozco, the album features Barrington Levy, Collie Buddz, and Slightly Stoopid on two tracks. 

Woodruff describes the album's name, "Wisdom is a journey and a search for what matters in life—a search for meaning, purpose, place and belonging. Wisdom is a code to live by where we can accept that it is okay to start over, to make mistakes, to love, and to feel pain. It is a reminder to focus on the little things that bring joy and know that all of it is a part of our individual story."

Wisdom debuted at No. 51 on the Billboard 200 chart, No. 1 on the Billboard Reggae Albums chart and No. 6 on the Billboard Independent Albums chart with 13,900 units sold from traditional sales and streaming during its first week of release. This made it the fourth consecutive Stick Figure album to debut at No. 1 on Billboard's Reggae Albums chart. By September 23rd, the album's total sales, including pre-released tracks, totaled over 41,000 units.
Wisdom is also being "considered" for a Grammy Award nomination for "Best Reggae Album" at the 65th Grammy Awards in 2023.

Other projects
Stick Figure’s song, "Burial Ground" was featured on MLB The Show 16 MVP Edition video game.

Stick Figure is currently collaborating with Wachusett Brewing Company to promote the new Cocoanut IPA, which is currently being distributed in New England.

Stick Figure collaborated with Flying Embers of Ojai, California to create a limited-edition special release called Stick Figure X Flying Embers Mango Coconut Hard Kombucha. The tropical flavor combines mangos blended with coconut with hints of turmeric and chili in a 16-ounce can featuring the band's artwork with Cocoa the tour dog.

Live lineup

Current members
 Scott Woodruff – lead vocals, lead guitar (2006–present)
 KBong – keyboards (2012–present)
 Kevin Offitzer – drums (2012–present)
 Tommy Suliman – bass (2012–present)
 Johnny Cosmic – keyboard, backup vocals, guitar (2016–present)
 Will Phillips  – percussion (2022–present)

Discography

Studio albums

Singles

Other releases

Compilation appearances
Sense Boardwear: Amplified – An Acoustic Collective, Vol. 6 (2008), The Pier Magazine / 1 track: ("Trouble Up There")

Collaborations

Featured artist
Stick Figure (Scott Woodruff) has collaborated or was featured on songs with artists and bands throughout the years.

Alific – "Under Arrest" (2013)
Regan Perry – "Best That I Can" (2013)
KBong – "Livin' Easy" (2014)
"Middle of the Ocean" (2018)
Iya Terra – "Give Thanks" (2017)
Slightly Stoopid – "Too Late" (2018)
The Movement – "Siren" (2019)
Pepper – "Warning" (2019)
TJ O'Neill – "A Pirate Looks at 40" (feat. KBong, Johnny Cosmic) (2019)
Iration – "Right Here Right Now" (feat. Eric Rachmany of Rebelution) (2020)
The Elovaters – "Gardenia" (2021)
SOJA – "Something To Believe In" (2021)
ANORA – "Love Me Easy" (produced by Walshy Fire of Major Lazer) (2022)

Produced
Josh Heinrichs – "Set Fire to the Rain" (no vocals)
Iya Terra – "Outerspace" (no vocals)
Sam Smith – "Stay With Me" (Reggae Remix)

Further reading
 Stick Figure Interview with KL Media (July 2013)

References

External links

 

American reggae musical groups
Musical groups from San Diego